Landmark International School is a mixed non-selective international school for children aged 6 to 16 located in Fulbourn village, on the outskirts of Cambridge, Cambridgeshire, England. It opened in September 2016 with a mission to give a creative education with unrivalled pastoral care, inclusivity and breadth of experience for its pupils. The school roll has since expanded from the initial 40 pupils to 70 at the beginning of its second year.

It was inspected by Ofsted in March 2017 and was graded Good in all areas.

References

Private schools in Cambridgeshire
Educational institutions established in 2016
2016 establishments in England
International schools in England
Fulbourn